Succor Creek is a  tributary of the Snake River in the U.S. states of Idaho and Oregon. The creek begins in the Owyhee Mountains in Owyhee County, Idaho. It joins the Snake near Homedale, about 413 river miles (665 km) from the larger river's confluence with the Columbia River.

It has only primitive camping with no potable water. The canyon in which the natural area is located is known for fossils, geologic formations, and thundereggs, the Oregon state rock.

See also
 List of rivers of Oregon
 List of longest streams of Oregon
 List of rivers of Idaho
 List of longest streams of Idaho

References

Owyhee Desert
Rivers of Idaho
Rivers of Malheur County, Oregon
Rivers of Oregon
Rivers of Owyhee County, Idaho
Tributaries of the Snake River